Lancaster Corporation Tramways operated a tramway service in Lancaster between 1903 and 1930.

History

Lancaster Corporation started tramway operation on 14 January 1903. The depot was located in King Street. The tramway closed on 4 April 1930. The depot buildings survived and are now known as Victoria Court.

References

Tram transport in England
Companies based in Lancaster, Lancashire
History of Lancaster
Historic transport in Lancashire
Transport in the City of Lancaster